Kutabad (also Romanized as Kūtābād) is a village in Esfandan Rural District, in the Central District of Komijan County, Markazi Province, Iran. At the 2006 census, its population was 357, split between 82 families.

References 

Populated places in Komijan County